Avenged Sevenfold (also known as The White Album) is the fourth studio album by American heavy metal band Avenged Sevenfold, released on October 30, 2007, through Warner Bros. and Hopeless Records. It is their last studio album to feature The Rev performing on drums, due to his death in December 2009 during production of their follow-up album, Nightmare.

Originally slated for an October 16 release, it was delayed by two weeks in order to provide more time to complete bonus material and production for the record. The album debuted at number 4 on the Billboard 200. As of 2023, it was certified platinum by the Recording Industry Association of America (RIAA) in the United States and gold by the British Phonographic Industry (BPI) in the United Kingdom. The band supported the album with a tour, beginning a day before the release of the album and ending in August 2009.

Although critical reception to the album was mixed compared to previous releases, Avenged Sevenfold won the Kerrang! Award for Best Album in 2008. In addition, the album was included in Kerrang!'s "666 Albums You Must Hear Before You Die". As of 2014, it has sold over 960,161 copies in the United States and 152,123 copies in the United Kingdom.

Background 

Avenged Sevenfold revealed the track listing for the album on their YouTube profile on August 9, 2007, as well as their text messaging service, A7X Mobile. The band also posted a teaser on a recent YouTube blog featuring an excerpt of vocalist M. Shadows screaming in the studio.

"Critical Acclaim" was the first single from the album. A 2-minute and 15-seconds teaser was posted on the band's MySpace to tide fans over until the iTunes release date, but on August 20, 2007, Avenged Sevenfold uploaded the full version on their MySpace. The full song was released on iTunes on August 28, 2007.

In the weeks leading up to the album's release, a series of ten video clips, called "webisodes", were recorded featuring "Wolfie the Fox". The first webisode was released on August 24, 2007; a 3:41 clip that was posted on the band's YouTube channel. The clip consists of a pre-recorded phone message from "Wolfie the Fox" and a few scenes of their process of making "Critical Acclaim". Each of the subsequent webisodes was similar in content. The clips featured a short mock-interview between M. Shadows and Wolfie the Fox, various band members during the making of various tracks for Avenged Sevenfold, and other background videos. About eleven days before the album's release, the Wolfie Trailer was posted on YouTube. In it, Wolfie sings "Critical Acclaim" and talks about the MVI version of the new album. The webisodes can all be viewed on the band's Myspace and YouTube pages.

By September 9, 2007, news leaked of the completion of a music video for the song "Almost Easy". It was directed by P.R. Brown, known for his collaborations with Mötley Crüe and Marilyn Manson, among many others. On September 12, 2007, the release date of the single "Almost Easy" was announced and was released six days later on September 18 to purchase via digital download.

The month of October was a busy one for the upcoming album. On October 3, Kerrang! released an article in which M. Shadows and Synyster Gates were interviewed about the new album. This day also saw the release of a live performance of "Almost Easy" at the Warped Tour 2007. Originally the band intended to release this footage if viewers watched the official music video for the track on YouTube 150,000 times. Though the goal fell short at 120,000 the band still released the footage. Another live video, featuring the third track "Scream" performed in Liverpool, England, was posted on YouTube on October 11. The song was also heard during a commercial for the Scream Awards on Spike TV.  M. Shadows can clearly be heard singing, "You know I make you wanna scream," which is an excerpt from the chorus. "Scream" was performed live at the 2007 Spike TV Scream Awards on October 23. Also, LoveLine played the radio premiere of "Afterlife" and "Almost Easy", which was guest hosted by M. Shadows and The Rev. Three days before, the Keyclub revealed an animated music video for "A Little Piece of Heaven".

To promote their new album, Avenged Sevenfold started their US tour on October 29, headlining in Los Angeles at The Wiltern. Their opening acts were Black Tide and Operator.

On October 30, 2007, Avenged Sevenfold was released in stores worldwide.

On October 31, 2008, Avenged Sevenfold mentioned that fans of the band were eligible to make their own music video for the song "Scream". The video had to be submitted to YouTube before November 30, 2008. The winner and five runners-up of the contest were announced on December 15, 2008. The winner received a new MacBook Air computer that came with Avenged Sevenfold videos, music, and other items from the band. The winning video was also featured on the Avenged Sevenfold website, MySpace page, YouTube account, and Facebook account. The five runners-up in this contest received a copy of the DVD and CD Live in the LBC & Diamonds in the Rough, signed by the members of the band; in addition, a merchandise pack was also rewarded to these runners-up.

Songs
"Critical Acclaim" was the first song written for the album, and was also released as the lead single. The song is about people in the United States who criticize each other, but never do anything to make a change. It also features lyrics about people not appreciating what soldiers do for them. The song received negative attention due to the perceived political nature of the lyrics, though bassist Johnny Christ explained that it was "more of a human thing", and not a criticism of one group of people.

"Almost Easy" was released as the second single from the album. The song was written by drummer The Rev. It was originally supposed to appear in the 2007 Transformers film, but it wasn't finished in time. It was later featured in the film's sequel, Revenge of the Fallen. The song has been certified platinum by the RIAA.

"Scream" is the third song on the record, and was released as the fifth and final single from the album in October 2008. The song opens with a scream by Valary Sanders, who is singer M. Shadows' wife.

"Afterlife" is about a man who dies suddenly, and finds himself in heaven. Although he enjoys the peace, he decides he needs to escape, because he isn't ready to die. The song didn't do as well on charts as "Almost Easy", but, although it hasn't been certified by the RIAA, the song has beaten all others from the album in terms of digital streams.

"Gunslinger" is the second song on the album to feature political lyrics. The song moves from a country ballad into a more regular hard rock song. The song is about a soldier returning home after war.

"Unbound (The Wild Ride)" is the sixth track on the album. It features a children's choir singing the outro. The song is singer M. Shadows least favorite Avenged Sevenfold song.

"Dear God" was the fourth single and a notable deviation from the band's usual heavy metal style, taking on more of a country feel. Johnny Christ has stated that the inspiration for the song came from the band's friendship with country act Big & Rich. Their influence can be heard in the background vocals of MuzikMafia member Shanna Crooks.

Musical style

The album represents a further move away from the metalcore of the band's early work, and away from the mainstream heavy metal sound of City of Evil, into more of a hard rock genre, with other genres represented on some songs. It has been considered a hard rock album with elements of symphonic rock,  rock, country music and experimental music. The band worked with brass and string sections on "A Little Piece of Heaven", an avant-garde metal song inspired by Broadway show tunes, in which horns and orchestral strings replaced the band's lead and rhythm guitars. The album features The Rev doing co-lead vocals on the songs "Critical Acclaim", "Scream", "Afterlife", "Lost", and "A Little Piece of Heaven".

Reception

Upon release, Avenged Sevenfold was met with mixed reviews. Metacritic accumulated an average score of 56 out of 100 based on thirteen reviews on the website.

Jason Lymangrover of AllMusic had given the album a rating of three stars out of five and wrote "While their willingness to experiment is admirable, despite the fact that they've gone overboard with their overdubs, the overabundance of studio polish leaves one to wonder if it's not because the songs just aren't as strong this time around". A more positive review came from Andrew Earles of The A.V. Club who commented "The catchy Stone Temple Pilots vibe of 'Scream' is enough to put the band back on the charts, but that could happen with more than half of this album...And it probably will". He graded the album a B.

The album wasn't without its more hostile responses. A much more negative review came from Dave de Sylvia of Sputnikmusic summarising "Avenged Sevenfold resemble a poor man's Hardcore Superstar" and rated the album one out of five.  Andrew Blackie of PopMatters rated the album two out of ten and dismissed it as being "Unoriginal, overlong even at a ten track setlist, and riddled with banality..." He even went far enough to add "...the disc is even being released the day before Halloween, could it get more corny?"

Despite the mixed reaction, the album won a Kerrang! Award for Best Album in 2008.

The USC Trojans Marching Band performed the song "Almost Easy" at the Rose Bowl halftime show on January 1, 2009.

Track listing
All songs credited to Avenged Sevenfold. Actual songwriters listed below.

Personnel
All credits adapted from the album's liner notes.
Avenged Sevenfold
M. Shadows – lead vocals, backing vocals
Zacky Vengeance – rhythm guitar, acoustic guitar on "Dear God", backing vocals
The Rev - drums, percussion, piano, backing vocals, co-lead vocals on "A Little Piece of Heaven", "Critical Acclaim", "Scream", "Lost", & "Afterlife"
Synyster Gates – lead guitar, backing vocals
Johnny Christ – bass guitar, backing vocals

Session musicians
Programming by Jay E on "Critical Acclaim" and "Scream"
Piano and Organ by Jamie Muhoberac on "Critical Acclaim", "Unbound (The Wild Ride)", 'Lost", and "A Little Piece of Heaven"
Piano by Greg Kusten on "Almost Easy"
Upright bass by Miles Mosley on "Afterlife", "Brompton Cocktail", and "A Little Piece of Heaven"
Cello by Cameron Stone on "Afterlife", "Brompton Cocktail", and "A Little Piece of Heaven"
Violins by Caroline Campbell and Neel Hammond on "Afterlife", "Brompton Cocktail", and "A Little Piece of Heaven"
Viola by Andrew Duckles on "Afterlife", "Brompton Cocktail", and "A Little Piece of Heaven"
Backing vocals by Zander Ayeroff and Annmarie Rizzo on "Unbound (The Wild Ride)"
Percussion by Lenny Castro on "Brompton Cocktail"
Choir: Beth Andersen, Monique Donnelly, Rob Giles, Debbie Hall, Scottie Haskell, Luana Jackman, Bob Joyce, Rock Logan, Susie Stevens Logan, Arnold McCuller, Gabriel Mann, and Ed Zajack on "Unbound (The Wild Ride)" and "A Little Piece of Heaven"
Alto sax by Bill Liston and Brandon Fields on "A Little Piece of Heaven"
Clarinet by Bill Liston and Rusty Higgins on "A Little Piece of Heaven"
Tenor sax by Dave Boruff and Rusty Higgins on "A Little Piece of Heaven"
Bari sax by Joel Peskin on "A Little Piece of Heaven"
Trumpet by Wayne Bergeron and Dan Foreno on "A Little Piece of Heaven"
Trombone by Bruce Fowler and Alex Iies on "A Little Piece of Heaven"
Additional vocals by Juliette Commagere on "A Little Piece of Heaven"
Lap, pedal steel and banjo by Greg Leisz on "Gunslinger" and "Dear God"
Additional vocals by Shanna Crooks on "Gunslinger" and "Dear God"
Additional vocals by Jaime Ochoa on "Critical Acclaim"
Scream on "Scream" by Valary Sanders
Production
Produced by Avenged Sevenfold
Engineered by Fred Archambault and Dave Schiffman, assisted by Clifton Allen, Chris Steffen, Robert DeLong, Aaron Walk, Mike Scielzi, and Josh Wilbur
Mixed by Andy Wallace
Mastered by Brian Gardner
Drum tech by Mike Fasano
Guitar tech by Walter Rice
'Fan Producers for a Day' (MVI) by Daniel McLaughlin and Christopher Guinn

Charts

Weekly charts

Year-end charts

Singles

Certifications

References

External links
 

2007 albums
Avenged Sevenfold albums
Warner Records albums
Albums recorded at Capitol Studios
Albums recorded at Sunset Sound Recorders